Rose Marie Nijkamp and Angella Okutoyi defeated Kayla Cross and Victoria Mboko in the final, 3–6, 6–4, [11–9] to win the girls' doubles tennis title at the 2022 Wimbledon Championships. Okutoyi became the first Kenyan to win a major title.

Kristina Dmitruk and Diana Shnaider were the reigning champions, but both were unable to participate. Dmitruk is no longer eligible to participate in junior tournaments, whilst both Dmitruk and Shnaider were prohibited from playing due to their Belarusian and Russian nationalities.

Seeds

Draw

Finals

Top half

Bottom half

References

External links

Draws

Girls' Doubles
Wimbledon Championship by year – Girls' doubles